Charles Billich is an artist living in Sydney, Australia. His painting subjects include Ballet and sport, architecture and town planning, eroticism and classicism, portraiture, and stage, as well as Humanitarian pieces and works of religious significance. In 2000, he received the Sport Artist of the Year Award presented annually by the American Sport Art Museum and Archives.

Charles Billich conceived a series of images based on the Bing Ma Yong Terracotta warriors.  The Bing Ma Yong images are represented on a collection of 16 postage stamps currently in circulation in China.

Biography

Charles Billich's works have hung in the White House, the United Nations Headquarters, and the Vatican.

Billich paints and draws in all media and sculpts in precious and semi-precious metals.

Humanity United was created from a brief extended to him by the Australian Red Cross to commemorate the 2001 Centenary of the Nobel Prize for Peace. Dr José Ramos-Horta, the then Minister of Foreign Affairs and Cooperation for East Timor, requested he paint their Independence painting.

In June 2004, Billich exhibited at the United Nations Headquarters in New York. Hosted by the UN Friendship Club, Billich was invited back with his Humanity United collection in September 2006.

Inspired by his work "The Beijing Cityscape", the official image for the successful Beijing bid to host the 2008 Olympic Games, Charles Billich conceived a series of images based on the Bing Ma Yong Terracotta Warriors. The collection of images, portray the Bing Ma Yong Terracotta Warriors in a series of sporting compositions.

In June 2004 Billich completed Jubilation China's 100 Year Olympic Dream Realised - a piece depicting the celebration that followed the announcement of China's to be the 2008 Olympic host nation.

Billich created a cityscape painting of the 2008 Olympic Water Sports Venue Qingdao, which has been presented to the Mayor and the Beijing Olympic Committee in Qingdao in July 2005.

Billich also created The World In Union. This is the official image of the Rugby World Cup 2003.

Charles Billich received the "Honorary Citizen of Atlanta" and the Key to the city during the Centennial Games; the title Sports Artist of the Year 2000, an Honorary Doctorate and the "Order of the Eagle Exemplar" from the United States Sports Academy and American Sport Art Museum. In 2004 he has also assumed the role of Trustee of this premier sports education facility. Billich has been decorated with the Olympic Gold Order by the French Ministry of Sport for his contributions to the French Olympic Team during the Sydney 2000 Olympic Games.

Eco Art Parade 2009

"Eco Art Parade 2009" was an environmental art exhibition in aid of the Prince Albert II Foundation of Monaco, themed around the Bonelli's Eagle, an endangered species of the Mediterranean, whose protection is supported by the Foundation.

To honor the Bonelli's Eagle, Charles Billich presented a bronze sculpture of "The Order of the Golden Eagle", which was on display from 8 June to 8 October 2009 in the Principality of Monaco.

Awards
 Commander of the Order of the Crown of Tonga (31 July 2008).
 77th Honorary Shaolin Monk, Henan, China 2004
 Milan & Spoleto Awards, Italy, 1989
 Victorian Heritage & Cultural Award 1988
 Centennial Olympic City, USA 1996
 Honorary Citizen of Atlanta,1996
 Order of the Eagle Exemplar, USA, 2000
 Doctor Philosophy Honoris Causa-United States Sports Academy
 Prints award/Gold Medal 1987/88
 Spoleto Award, Italy, 1987

References

External links

 Official site – Australia and Asia
 Official site – Europe
 "Home Is Where My Art Is" - Financial Times – Weekend Edition, 28 March 2008
 "Century-old Olympic Dream Comes True – on Canvas," 29 July 2004
 "Olympic Artist Shows Painting: Magnificent Tianjin
 "Sport Artist of the Year 2000: Charles Billich" (CCTV.com)

1934 births
Living people
People from Lovran
20th-century Croatian painters
Croatian male painters
21st-century Croatian painters
21st-century Croatian male artists
21st-century Australian male artists
Australian male painters
Australian people of Croatian descent
20th-century Croatian male artists
20th-century Australian male artists
Commanders of the Order of the Crown of Tonga